HC Otkan Perm is an ice hockey team in Perm, Russia. They play in the Pervaya Liga, the third level of Russian ice hockey. The club was founded in 2008.

External links
Official website

Ice hockey teams in Russia
Junior Hockey League (Russia) teams